Lajos Walko (30 October 1880 – 10 January 1954) was a Hungarian politician, who served as Minister of Foreign Affairs between 1925 and 1930. Around half year ago he was also appointed to this position. He worked for the Ministry of Finance. He served as interim Minister of Finance twice and Minister of Trade. As foreign minister he carried a considerable role the Horthy system happened to an external loan in his financial stabilisation. From 1938 he was the president of the Hungarian Commercial Bank in Budapest.

References
 Magyar Életrajzi Lexikon

External links
 

1880 births
1954 deaths
Politicians from Budapest
Foreign ministers of Hungary
Finance ministers of Hungary
People from Visegrád